Marlies may refer to the following:

Sports teams
Toronto Marlies, an American Hockey League team
Toronto Marlboros, a former junior hockey team in the Ontario Hockey League, colloquially nicknamed "The Marlies" for short

People
Marlies is a Dutch and German feminine given name. It is a contraction of Maria and either Louise or Liesbeth. People with the name include:
Marlies Amann-Marxer (born 1952), Liechtenstein Minister of Infrastructure
Marlies Askamp (born 1970), German basketball player
Marlies van Baalen (born 1980), Dutch Dressage equestrian
Marlies Bänziger (born 1960), Swiss politician
Marlies ter Borg (born 1948), Dutch philosopher, editor and author
Marlies Deneke (born 1953), East German politician
Marlies Dekkers (born 1965), Dutch fashion designer
Marlies Dumbsky (born 1985), German Wine Queen 2008/09
Marlies Gipson (born 1987), American basketball player
Marlies Göhr (born 1958), East German athlete
Marlies Horn (1912–1991), German tennis player
Marlies Lause (born 1940), German actress
Marlies Mejías (born 1992), Cuban road and track cyclist
Marlies Oberholzer (born 1958), Swiss alpine skier
Marlies Oester (born 1976), Swiss alpine skier
Marlies Oostdam (born 1977), Dutch-New Zealand football player
Marlies Pohl (born 1955), East German swimmer
Marlies Rostock (born 1960), East German cross country skier
Marlies Schild (born 1981), Austrian alpine skier
Marlies Smulders (born 1982), Dutch rower
Marlies Somers (born 1973), Dutch voice actor
Marlies Veldhuijzen van Zanten (born 1953), Dutch State Secretary of Health
Marlies Verbruggen (born 1988), Belgian footballer
Marlies Wagner (born 1983), Austrian luger
Marlie DeRuvo (born 2010),  professional simp

See also
Marliese Echner-Klingmann (born 1937), German poet playwright
Marliese Edelmann (born 1988), Mexican beauty queen
Marliese Kasner (born 1982), Canadian curler
Marliece Andrada (born 1972), American Playboy Playmate

Dutch feminine given names
German feminine given names